Bruce Bechtel (born February 13, 1955) is an American former professional stock car racing driver. He competed in ten races in the NASCAR Busch Series between 2002 and 2004. He also competed part-time in the NASCAR Featherlite Southwest Tour between 1997 and 2001, and the NASCAR Winston West Series part-time in 1997 and 1998 (where he had two top 10 finishes in 1998).

Racing career

Personal life
Bechtel is from Corona, California where he works as an electrical contractor by trade.

Motorsports career results

NASCAR
(key) (Bold – Pole position awarded by qualifying time. Italics – Pole position earned by points standings or practice time. * – Most laps led.)

Busch Series

Winston West Series

ARCA Re/Max Series
(key) (Bold – Pole position awarded by qualifying time. Italics – Pole position earned by points standings or practice time. * – Most laps led.)

References

External links
 

1955 births
Living people
NASCAR drivers
Sportspeople from Corona, California
Racing drivers from California